Augusto César Cardoso de Carvalho  (31 March 1836 – 3 February 1905) was a Portuguese colonial administrator and a general of the Portuguese Army. He was governor of Portuguese Timor from 1880 to 1881, governor-general of Portuguese India from 16 December 1886 until 27 April 1889 and governor of Cape Verde from 12 June 1889 until 4 February 1890.

During his tenure as governor of Timor, in early 1881, the Timorese Kingdom of Cová submitted to Portuguese authority. During his administration in Portuguese India, the harbour of Mormugao and the railway line from there to the then-border with British India were opened.

See also
List of colonial governors of Cape Verde
List of colonial governors of Portuguese Timor
List of governors of Portuguese India

References

External links

1836 births
1905 deaths
Colonial heads of Cape Verde
Colonial heads of Portuguese Timor
Governors-General of Portuguese India
Portuguese colonial governors and administrators